Philip King  (March 16, 1872 – January 7, 1938) was an American football player, coach, and lawyer. He played quarterback for the Princeton Tigers football team of Princeton University from 1890 to 1893, and was selected to the College Football All-America Team in 1891, 1892, and 1893. After his playing days, he served as the head football coach at the University of Wisconsin–Madison from 1896 to 1902 and again in 1905, and at Georgetown University in 1903, compiling a career college football record of 73–14–1. He was inducted into the College Football Hall of Fame as a player in 1962.

Early life
King, who was Jewish, was born in Washington, D.C.

Coaching career
At Wisconsin, King compiled a 66–11–1 (.853) record. The Badgers had four nine-win seasons during his tenure. King's 1896 and 1897 teams won the first two football championships of the Big Ten Conference, then known as the Western Conference. King's 1901 Wisconsin team went 9–0, outscored its opponents 317–5, and tied with Michigan for another conference title. His 66 wins was the most of any head coach in program history until Barry Alvarez passed him in 1999. 

In 1903, King guided the Georgetown Blue and Gray to a 7–3 record.

Head coaching record

Football

See also
 List of college football head coaches with non-consecutive tenure

References

External links
 
 

1872 births
1938 deaths
19th-century players of American football
American football quarterbacks
Georgetown Hoyas baseball coaches
Georgetown Hoyas football coaches
Princeton Tigers football players
Wisconsin Badgers baseball coaches
Wisconsin Badgers football coaches
All-American college football players
College Football Hall of Fame inductees
Coaches of American football from Washington, D.C.
Players of American football from Washington, D.C.
Baseball coaches from Washington, D.C.
Jewish American sportspeople
Jewish American baseball people